St. Anne of the Sunset Catholic Church in San Francisco is a parish of the Archdiocese of San Francisco in San Francisco, California. St. Anne is one of four Sunset District Catholic churches and mainly caters to the Inner Sunset area near Golden Gate Park and the University of California, San Francisco hospital campus.

The larger, rosy-red church can easily be seen from anywhere in the Inner Sunset and a MUNI streetcar has a line that travels along Judah Street in front of the Church. Every year, the parishioners of St. Anne's hold a novena honoring their patron saint, in which they have a procession around the neighborhood, commencing in the vestibule of the church.

The parish has an illustrious history, dating back to its founding in 1904. The parish grew up with the Sunset neighborhood, originally known as the "Outside Lands," which were made up entirely of sand dunes extending out to present-day Ocean Beach. The first church, a small wood-frame structure, was built in 1905 on land donated by a Mrs. Jane Callahan. The church, which seated up to 450 people, was toppled in the 1906 earthquake. Though it was rebuilt and extended to accommodate the growing parish, it became apparent that a new church was needed. Groundbreaking and construction began in 1930 and the church was completed three years later and dedicated by Archbishop John J. Mitty.

The church is notable for its Romanesque-revival architecture, massive dome, uneven twin towers, great rose windows, and the frieze sculpture that adorns the front facade entrance. The sculpture, created by Mission San Jose Sister Justina Niemierski, depicts a "scriptural account of the whole of salvation history." The parish school opened in 1920 and still serves the children of the neighborhood.

In addition to English, the church celebrates mass in Arabic and Cantonese, a reflection of the very diverse parish.

Pastors
 Fr. Joseph J. McCue (1904-1911)
 Fr. William O’Mahoney (1911-1936)
 Msgr. Patrick G. Moriarty (1936-1970)
 Msgr. John T. Foudy (1970-1990)
 Fr. Richard S. Deitch (1990-1995)
 Fr. Anthony E. McGuire (1995-1998)
 Fr. Eduardo A. Dura (1998-2006)
 Fr. Raymund M. Reyes (2006-2014)
 Fr. Daniel Nascimento (2014-present)

External links
 St. Anne of the Sunset website

Roman Catholic Archdiocese of San Francisco
Anne of the Sunset in San Francisco, Saint
Christian organizations established in 1904
Roman Catholic churches in San Francisco
Romanesque Revival church buildings in California
Buildings and structures destroyed in the 1906 San Francisco earthquake